(born 7 May 1999) is a Japanese snowboarder who competes in the big air and slopestyle events. He represented Japan at the 2022 Winter Olympics.

Career
During the 2019–20 FIS Snowboard World Cup, Tobita won the slopestyle Crystal Globe as the overall champion in the event. During the 2021 World Championships, he finished in fourth place in the big air event.

He represented Japan at the 2022 Winter Olympics in the men's slopestyle and big air events.

References

1999 births
Living people
Japanese male snowboarders
Sportspeople from Tokyo
Olympic snowboarders of Japan
Snowboarders at the 2022 Winter Olympics
21st-century Japanese people